Filemon Anyie Standly (born 27 July 1997) is a Malaysian footballer who plays as a right-back for Malaysia Super League club Negeri Sembilan. He also can operate as a left-back.

Born in Miri, Sarawak, Filemon started his football career playing for Sarawak youth team in 2017.

Club Career 
He was officially announced as a new Negeri Sembilan player on 15 January 2023.

Career statistics

Club
(Correct as of 23 December 2022)

References

External links
 

1997 births
PKNP FC players
Association football defenders
Living people
People from Sarawak
Malaysian footballers
Petaling Jaya City FC players
Negeri Sembilan FC players
Malaysia Super League players